KRKW-LP is a non-profit radio station in Waimea, Kauai County, Hawaii. Owned and operated by Waimea Baptist Church, the station broadcasts a mix of Christian and community radio content.

It has an effective radiated power of 100 watts on the frequency of 107.3 MHz.

History
The license application was prepared by station manager Ron Olen, beginning in early 2013. The construction permit was issued by the FCC in March 2014. On-air brodasting began in August 2015.

The broadcasting facility is located in the basement of the Waimea Baptist Church on the island of Kauai, with the antenna located in the steeple. The studios also house a recording studio used to produce local programming and record local artists for broadcast on air. Waimea Baptist Church is listed on the National Register of Historic Places.

See also
List of FM radio stations in the United States by call sign (initial letters KQ–KS)

References

External links 
 

RKW-LP
Radio stations established in 2015
2015 establishments in Hawaii
RKW-LP